The Lanë is the main stream that crosses through Tirana, the capital of Albania. Its source is in the mountains east of Tirana. Although once clean, it now carries sewage. During the 1990s, many illegal kiosks and buildings were constructed on the banks of the river. They were later torn down and removed in a campaign by Tirana's then mayor Edi Rama in the early 2000s. Now most of its banks have been planted with different kinds of trees and grass. No fish live there now due to the high pollution of its waters. The Lanë flows into the Tiranë River near Bërxullë.

See also
 List of Albanian rivers

References 
 Genomic Characterization of Human and Environmental Polioviruses Isolated in Albania, Applied and Environmental Microbiology, August 1999, p. 3534-3539, Vol. 65, No. 8
 Genomic characterization of human and environmental polioviruses isolated in Albania PubMed

Bodies of water of Tirana
Rivers of Albania
Geography of Tirana County